Joint Stock Commercial Bank for Foreign Trade of Vietnam, commonly referred to as Vietcombank, is a commercial bank in Vietnam.

Overview 
Vietcombank's headquarters are located in Hanoi, Vietnam.  the bank had 116 branches and 474 transaction offices in Vietnam, 3 local subsidiaries, 3 overseas subsidiaries, 3 joint ventures, and an overseas representative office in Singapore. As of December 31, 2020, Vietcombank's market capitalization was $15.5 billion.

History 
Joint Stock Commercial Bank for Foreign Trade of Vietnam was founded on 1 April 1963 as Bank for Foreign trade of Vietnam. It was span off from the Foreign Exchange Bureau of the State Bank of Vietnam to be an exclusive bank for foreign trade.

In 1990, Vietcombank diversified its services from being exclusively focused on foreign trade to a become a mass market commercial bank. In 1996 the bank's official name was changed to Joint Stock Commercial Bank for Foreign Trade of Vietnam.

In 2008, Vietcombank was selected by the government to be the pilot for privatization of state-owned companies. The bank was then after listed on the Ho Chi Minh Stock Exchange on 30 June 2009 after a successful IPO that raised US$652 million making it the biggest Vietnamese firm to conduct an initial public offering.

Member companies 
Other than providing banking services, Vietcombank has invested in subsidiaries, joint ventures and associates. These investments include but are not limited to the following:

Ownership 
The shares of the stock of Vietcombank are traded on the Ho Chi Minh Stock Exchange, under the symbol: VCB. , The shareholding in the bank's stock was a follows:

Governance 
Vietcombank is governed by a seven-person Board of Directors with Pham Quang Dung serving as Chairman and CEO.

Vietcombank Tower 

Vietcombank Tower is 35 storey building in Ho Chi Minh City. The tower is a venture between Vietcombank and FELS Property Holding of Singapore.

The tower is located at District 1, Ho Chi Minh City. With the height of 206 meters, it is the third tallest building in Ho Chi Minh City and the seventh tallest building in Vietnam.

The construction began in 2011 and completed in 2014. This tower's shape is different than the Empire State Building because it has modern architecture with gray colored-glass. In addition to Vietcombank, corporate tenants with offices in the building include Lotte, Heineken Vietnam, Johnson & Johnson, SSI, Idemitsu, Sun Life Financial, and Pernod Ricard Vietnam.

See also 
 Banking in Vietnam
 List of banks in Vietnam
 State Bank of Vietnam

References

External links 
 Joint Stock Commercial Bank for Foreign Trade of Vietnam
 ASEAN 100 - Joint Stock Commercial Bank for Foreign Trade of Vietnam

Banks of Vietnam
Companies listed on the Ho Chi Minh City Stock Exchange
Vietnamese brands
Banks established in 1963
Vietnamese companies established in 1963